Robert Durham may refer to:

Robert D. Durham (born 1947), judge
Bobby Durham (jazz musician) (1937–2008), American jazz drummer
Bobby Durham (country musician) (born 1942), American country singer
Robert Durham (Arena football) (born 1983), American football defensive back
Robert Lee Durham (1870–1949), American engineer, teacher and author
Robert L. Durham (1912–1998), American architect